Maakurathu (Dhivehi: މާކުރަތު) is one of the inhabited islands of Raa Atoll in the Maldives. Sultan Mohamed I is from Maakurathu. He is also the husband of Sultana Raadhafathi.

Geography

Council Members
 Mohamed Rameez (president)
 Ali Azleem (vice President)
 Abdusamad Yoosuf (council Members)
 Mariyam Saeedha ( council Member)
 Moomina Mohamed ( council Member)

Demography
The population of the island is 1330, according to the census of August 2017, of whom 630 are women and 700 are men. Maakurathu's population growth rate is 18 children per annum and it has the eighth highest population in the atoll.

Governance
 Maakurathu Council Edhaaraa
 Maakurathu Mejistrat Court
 Maakurathu Youth Center
 Maakurathu School
 Maakurathu pre-school
 masjid salaam (friday mosque)
 masjid anwaar
 masjid Najahiyya (special for Woman)

Economy
The main source of the community's income comes from the lobster and Sea cucumber trade, fishing, agriculture, masonry, thatch weaving and rope making.

Clubs and NGOs
The clubs and NGOs operating in Maakurathu are:
 Maakurathu Sports Club (registered date: 1 March 2000)
 Maakurathu Akuveringe Dhirun (registered date: 17 January 2005)
 People's Association of Maakurathu - PEAMA (registered date: 2009)
 Maakurathu cooperative society - 16 November 2017

Education
There is one government school, Maakurathu School, which provides education from grade 1 to 10. There is one pre-school, which is owned and run by the public and backed by Maakurathu Sports Club, which provides education for lower and upper kindergarten.

 1  Maakurathu School ( grade 1 - 10 )
 1 Maakurathu Pre-school ( Nursery , LKG ) 
 1 Maakurathu Learning Center ( registered on 2022)

Health
 Maakurathu Health Center

Religion
There are three mosques on the island, one for men and two for women: Majid-Al-Salaam, Masjid-Al-Anwaar and Masjid-Al-(******). The two mosques for women are relatively small compared to the one for men. Masjid-Al-Salaam was completely demolished in August 2007 to build a new mosque.

References

External links
 www.maakurathu.com
 People’s Association of Maakurathu – PEAMA
 www.facebook.com/maakurathu

Islands of the Maldives